Nelly Lucinda Consuelo Meruane Solano (20 December 1927 – 20 June 2018) was a distinguished Chilean actress and teacher whose career spanned 65 years.

Meruane was recognized for her leading roles in the television series  (1967), the telenovela La madrastra (1981), and the play Mama Rosa (1982). She received several honors, such as an  Award in 2011 and an Altazor in 2014.

Biography
Nelly Meruane was born in Nueva Toltén on 20 December 1927. She showed a strong interest in the performing arts from a very young age. Due to strong opposition from her parents, she studied pedagogy in Spanish, but also took theater classes in parallel. When beginning her studies at the University of Chile's Pedagogical Institute, she also entered the school's Dramatic Arts Center (CADIP), joining the cast of several plays under the stage name Sonia del Solar. Later, she majored in theater at the Catholic University. She debuted in the play Time and the Conways at the Municipal Theatre of Santiago in 1952 as a first-year student of the Theater Academy.

In the following years, she popularized the role of La Cotocó in the TV series , starring alongside . She met actor  when he appeared on the show in 1969, and married him 45 days later.

She subsequently traveled to Venezuela with Bistoto, achieving a distinguished career in theater and television there. In 1977 she starred in the film El Pez que Fuma, directed by the playwright Román Chalbaud. She returned to Chile in 1981, and played Dora in Arturo Moya Grau's successful telenovela La madrastra. In 1982 she starred in Mama Rosa by Fernando Debesa, a performance which was lauded as one of her best. She continued to appear in films and television, with her last acting role being Señora Felman on the telenovela Chipe libre in 2014. In 2016 she was featured in the documentary Viejos amores, along with six other veteran actresses.

Nelly Meruane died in Santiago on 20 June 2018, nine days after her contemporary and frequent co-star Liliana Ross.

In November 2018 she received a posthumous career tribute from the Actors Guild of Chile.

Works

Films
  by R. Sánchez (1962)
 Angelito by L. Cornejo (1965)
 El Pez que Fuma by Román Chalbaud (1977)
 Fuga by Pablo Larraín (2006)
 Viejos amores (2016)

Telenovelas

TV series and specials

Plays

Awards
 , 2006
  Career Award, 2011
 University of Chile Fearab Award for Distinguished Professional Career, 2012
 Altazor Award for Best Actress in Coronación, 2014
 Distinguished Public Personality from the Municipality of Providencia, 2017

References

External links
 

1927 births
2018 deaths
Chilean people of Palestinian descent
20th-century Chilean actresses
21st-century Chilean actresses
Chilean film actresses
Chilean schoolteachers
Chilean stage actresses
Chilean telenovela actresses
People from Cautín Province
University of Chile alumni